Liu Shikun (born March 8, 1939) is a Chinese pianist and composer.

He began his piano training at the age of three and started publicly performing by the age of five. He won third prize and the Special Prize of the Liszt International Piano Competition in Budapest in 1956 and was awarded a strand of Franz Liszt's hair. In 1958, he shared with Lev Vlassenko the second prize in the First Tchaikovsky International Piano Competition in Moscow.

Liu became one of China's top concert performers until 1966, when the Cultural Revolution and the Gang of Four attacked the country; Western music was banned and, along with thousands of other artists, Liu was arrested. He stayed in prison for eight years.

Liu studied at Beijing's Central Conservatory of Music and graduated from the Moscow Conservatory of Music.

References 

1939 births
Living people
Chinese classical pianists
Chinese male classical composers
Chinese classical composers
Moscow Conservatory alumni
People's Republic of China composers
Musicians from Tianjin
Victims of the Cultural Revolution
Male classical pianists